Symonanthus bancroftii, also known as Bancroft's Symonanthus, is a species of flowering plant in the potato family that is endemic to Australia.

Etymology
The specific epithet bancroftii honours Queensland surgeon Joseph Bancroft for his pharmacological research on Australian plants.

Description
The species grows as an erect shrub to 1 m in height, covered with grey hairs. The oval leaves are 8 mm long and 4.5 mm wide. The flowers are dull yellow-green, with the corolla 5–6 mm long. The fruit is a shiny round red berry 5–10 mm in diameter.

Distribution and habitat
Bancroft's Symonanthus is very rare and known only from a few localities in the south-eastern Wheatbelt region of south-west Western Australia.

Conservation
The species is listed as Endangered under Australia's EPBC Act.

References

bancroftii
Eudicots of Western Australia
Solanales of Australia
Taxa named by Ferdinand von Mueller
Plants described in 1883